Baldwin West Aerodrome  is a registered aerodrome located adjacent to Baldwin, Ontario, Canada.

See also
Baldwin Airport

References

Registered aerodromes in Ontario